Choi Woo-sung (born May 21, 1997) is a South Korean actor. He is known for his role as Lee Dan in tvN television series My Roommate Is a Gumiho (2021).

Filmography

Film

Television series

Web series

Awards and nominations

References

External links 
 
 

1997 births
Living people
Dongguk University alumni
21st-century South Korean male actors
South Korean male film actors
South Korean male television actors
South Korean male web series actors